John George Thompson (active 1919–1927) was an English professional footballer who made 120 Football League appearances playing as a right back for Aston Villa and Brighton & Hove Albion.

Life and career
Thompson was born in Cramlington, Northumberland. He played football for Ashington of the North-Eastern League before signing for Aston Villa in November 1919 for a fee reported as £300. He went straight into their team for the Football League First Division match against West Bromwich Albion: asked if he was nervous, he is reported to have replied "Why no, I fought against the Germans!" He made 17 appearances in what remained of the season, but played only 11 times in 1920–21 after losing his place to Tommy Smart.

Thompson signed for Brighton & Hove Albion of the Third Division South in August 1921. He was a first-team regular for three seasons, part of a defence that in 1922–23 set a club record for fewest goals conceded in a Football League season, of 34, that stood for more than 60 years. His professional career was ended by an ankle injury sustained during a match away against Norwich City in April 1924, and he went on to work as a bus driver in Brighton.

Notes

References

Year of birth missing
Year of death missing
People from Cramlington
Footballers from Northumberland
English footballers
Association football fullbacks
Ashington A.F.C. players
Aston Villa F.C. players
Brighton & Hove Albion F.C. players
English Football League players